The blue grosbeak (Passerina caerulea), is a medium-sized North American passerine bird in the cardinal family Cardinalidae. It is mainly migratory, wintering in Central America and breeding in northern Mexico and the southern United States. The male is blue with two brown . The female is mainly brown with scattered blue feathers on the upperparts and two brown wing bars.

Taxonomy
The blue grosbeak was formally described by the Swedish naturalist Carl Linnaeus in 1758 in the tenth edition of his Systema Naturae under the binomial name Loxia caerulea. The specific epithet caerulea is the Latin word for "blue", "azure-blue", "sky-blue" or "dark-blue". Linnaeus based his own description on the "blew gross-beak" described and illustrated by Mark Catesby in his The Natural History of Carolina, Florida and the Bahama Islands. The book had been published in 1729–1732. Catesby gave the location as Carolina and Linnaeus specified America. The type location is now restricted to South Carolina.

Some taxonomists placed the blue grosbeak in its own monotypic genus Guiraca but in 2001 a molecular phylogenetic study of mitochondrial DNA sequences found that the blue grosbeak, in spite of being physically larger, nested within the Passerina and was most closely related to the lazuli bunting. The species is therefore now placed with the North American buntings in Passerina, a genus that was introduced by the French ornithologist Louis Jean Pierre Vieillot in 1816.

Seven subspecies are recognised: 
 P. c. caerulea (Linnaeus, 1758) – southeast and south central USA
 P. c. interfusa (Dwight & Griscom, 1927) – west central USA and north Mexico
 P. c. salicaria (Grinnell, 1911) – southwest USA and northwest Mexico
 P. c. eurhyncha (Coues, 1874) – central and south Mexico
 P. c. chiapensis (Nelson, 1898) – south Mexico to Guatemala
 P. c. deltarhyncha (Van Rossem, 1938) – west Mexico
 P. c. lazula (Lesson, R, 1842) – south Guatemala to northwest Costa Rica

Description
The male blue grosbeak is deep blue, with both black and brown on its wings. The female is mostly brown. Both sexes are distinguished by their large, deep bill and double wing bars. These features, as well as the grosbeak's relatively larger size, distinguish this species from the indigo bunting.

Distribution and habitat
This is a migratory bird, with nesting grounds across most of the southern half of the United States and much of northern Mexico, migrating south to Central America and in very small numbers to northern South America; the southernmost record comes from eastern Ecuador.

This species is found in partly open habitat with scattered trees, riparian woodland, scrub, thickets, cultivated lands, woodland edges, overgrown fields, or hedgerows.

Behaviour and ecology

Breeding

Feeding
It eats mostly insects, but it will also eat snails, spiders, seeds, grains, and wild fruits. The blue grosbeak forages mainly on the ground.

Gallery

References

External links

 Xeno-canto: audio recordings of the blue grosbeak
Cornell Lab of Ornithology - All About Birds: Blue grosbeak
eBird: Blue grosbeak

blue grosbeak
Birds of the United States
Birds of Central America
Birds of Mexico
Birds of Guatemala
Birds of El Salvador
blue grosbeak
blue grosbeak